Cycling at the 2014 African Youth Games took place from 22 to 27 May 2014 in Kgale Hill (MTB) & Road of Gaborone, Gaborone, Botswana. There were 8 events contested in this sport.

Medal summary

Women Junior Team Time Trial

Men Junior Team Time Trial

Women Junior Individual Time Trial

Men Junior Individual Time Trial

Women Junior Road Race

Men Junior Road Race

Women Junior Cross Country Olympic

Men Junior Cross Country Olympic

References

/

African Youth Games
2014 African Youth Games
African Youth Games
African Youth Games